Opening Skinner's Box: Great Psychological Experiments of the Twentieth Century (W. W. Norton & Company, 2004), is a book by Lauren Slater.

In this book, Slater sets out to describe some of the psychological experiments of the twentieth century.  Controversially, the author also describes the urban legend that B.F. Skinner raised his child in a Skinner box in a way which many perceived as being poorly researched and lending credit to a false claim.

Experiments covered

 The work and experiments of B. F. Skinner
 Stanley Milgram's controversial 1950s experiment designed to explain obedience to authority to a post-Holocaust world.
 David Rosenhan's disturbing 1970s experiment that questioned the validity of psychiatric diagnosis itself.
 Darley and Latane's helping behavior studies
 Leon Festinger's theory of Cognitive dissonance among cult members whose apocalypse fails to arrive
 Rat Park, a study into drug addiction conducted in the late 1970s, by Canadian psychologist Bruce K. Alexander, that aimed to show that drugs do not cause addiction, and that the apparent addiction to opiate drugs commonly observed in laboratory rats exposed to it is attributable to their living conditions, and not to any addictive property of the drug itself.
 The misinformation effect discovered by Elizabeth Loftus which has given rise to the lost in the mall technique.
 Harry Harlow, an American psychologist best known for his maternal-separation and social isolation experiments on rhesus monkeys, which demonstrated the importance of care-giving and companionship in social and cognitive development.
 António Egas Moniz and his development of lobotomy.
 Eric Kandel who discovered that CREB was identified as being a protein involved in long-term memory storage. One result of CREB activation is an increase in the number of synaptic connections. Thus, short-term memory had been linked to functional changes in existing synapses, while long-term memory was associated with a change in the number of synaptic connect

Controversy 

B. F. Skinner's daughter Deborah criticised the book for its claims that she had been raised in a box and committed suicide. The book, indeed, mentioned such claims, but also rebutted them with an interview with Deborah's sister, Julie Vargas. In an article for The Guardian, Deborah described the claims as "doing her family a disservice" and stated that she was a very healthy child growing up.  Skinner's daughter also described the truth behind the photographs which spawned the legend, namely that her father had developed a heated crib for her, later marketed under the name "Air-Crib", which had been mistaken by the public for a Skinner box.

References 

 Slater, Lauren. "Chapter 1." Opening Skinner's Box: Great Psychological Experiments of the Twentieth Century. New York: W.W. Norton, 2004. 6–30.

Psychology books